Robert Charles Ogleby (born 5 January 1992) is a footballer, who last played for Wingate & Finchley as a striker. Although born in England, he has played internationally for Wales. He has previously played for Heart of Midlothian, East Fife and Wrexham. Rob played and scored in a 5–3 loss for local amateur team Weirside Rangers 2 years after retiring from professional football. He was a scout for Wrexham, before leaving for a career in non-sporting recruitment.

Career

Hearts
Ogleby was with Coventry City as a youth, but was released by them after two years. He signed for Heart of Midlothian (Hearts) in 2010 and initially played for their under 19 squad. He was promoted to the first team on the final day of the 2010–11 season, but did not make an appearance in the match against Dundee United.

At the start of the 2011–12 season, Ogleby was sent on loan to East Fife to gain first team experience. On his return to Hearts he went on trial with Falkirk with a view to a further loan. The loan deal never materialised and on 31 January 2012 he negotiated early release from his Hearts contract.

East Fife (loan)
Having yet to break into the Hearts first team Ogleby joined East Fife on loan on a six-month deal in July 2011. Making his debut in a friendly against parent club Hearts. On 23 July 2011 in his first competitive start for the club he scored a hat trick against Montrose in East Fife's 6–1 win in the Challenge Cup. He went on to make his league debut on 6 August against Stirling. Due to match call off's in December, appearances were limited and his last game came on 2 January against Cowdenbeath. In all he made 19 appearances in all competitions scoring 8 times before returning to Hearts.

Wrexham
After his release from his Hearts contract he joined Conference National side Wrexham on a 3-month deal. He was given the number 31 shirt. He made his debut as a substitute on 14 March, in a 5–0 win over Ebbsfleet. Ogleby was given a new contract at Wrexham ahead of the 2012/13 and given the number 15 shirt, he played a large part in Wrexham's pre-season matches, He scored goals in games against Aberystwyth, Kilmarnock, Bala Town and Coventry City. In the opening game of the 2012/13 Conference season Ogleby scored Wrexham's first goal of the League campaign with a superb goal at the Racecourse against Woking in a 3–1 victory. He picked up his first career honour in March 2013 winning the FA Trophy with the North Wales club. Ogelby scored the winning goal with his first touch of the game after coming on as an 82nd-minute substitute in Wrexham's opening day 2–1 win over Welling United. Ogleby also scored both goals in a 2–0 win for Wrexham against Hyde FC as they advanced to the 1st round proper of the 2013–14 FA Cup. On 28 December 2013 Ogleby scored a hat trick against Hyde this time in a 5–2 win at Ewan Fields, in the league. On 1 May 2014, Ogleby was released by Wrexham.

Livingston
Ogleby signed for Livingston in July 2014.

Nuneaton Town
In January 2015, Ogleby joined Nuneaton Town. He made his debut on 17 January 2015 in a 0–2 home loss to Gateshead. He scored his first goal on 7 February 2015 in a 4–0 home win over Football League Championship side Wolverhampton Wanderers.

Leamington

On 22 May 2015 it was announced that Ogleby had signed with Southern League outfit Leamington F.C.

International career
He made his debut for Wales U21 on 27 November 2010 against Austria. He went on to appear against Northern Ireland on 9 January scoring in only his second appearance. He scored his second goal in the 89th minute of 3–0 win over Iceland on 6 February 2013.

Career honours
 Wrexham
 FA Trophy 2012-13

Career statistics

References

1992 births
Living people
Footballers from Coventry
English people of Welsh descent
Welsh footballers
Wales under-21 international footballers
Coventry City F.C. players
Heart of Midlothian F.C. players
East Fife F.C. players
Wrexham A.F.C. players
Scottish Football League players
National League (English football) players
Livingston F.C. players
Leamington F.C. players
Nuneaton Borough F.C. players
Wingate & Finchley F.C. players
Association football forwards